The Cabin Crew is a 2014 Chinese inspirational film directed and written by Guan Xiaojie, starring Zhao Yihuan, Wen Zhuo, Liu Yuting, and Qin Hanlei. The film was released in China on International Workers' Day.

Cast
 Zhao Yihuan as Zhao Xiaofan
 Wen Zhuo as Yu Zhi
 Liu Yuting as Liu Zhengzheng
 Qin Hanlei as Wei Junzhi
 Zou Yang as Tang Guo
 Kingdom Yuen as Teacher Yuen
 Li Manyi as President Lingyan
 Teddy Chin as Chen Xueyou
 Jiang Shan as Senior
 Xie Jiayu as Jiali
 Ma Sise as Taozi
 Gu Yue as Xiao Xiena
 Yin Zhe as Jin Mimi
 Huang Zhenyan as Huimei
 Steve Yap as the plane captain
 Tani Lin as a stewardess
 Christina Tseng as a stewardess
 Cathy Shyu as a stewardess
 Candy Chen as a stewardess

Production
Filming took place in Kota Kinabalu and Shanghai.

References

External links
 

Films shot in Shanghai
Films shot in Malaysia
Films directed by Guan Xiaojie
Chinese drama films